Kallikrein 8 (KLK8, PRSS19, human kallikrein 8, hK8, mK8, ovasin, tumor-associated differentially expressed gene 14, TADG-14, NP, neuropsin) is an enzyme. This enzyme catalyses the following chemical reaction

 Cleavage of amide substrates following the basic amino acids Arg or Lys at the P1 position, with a preference for Arg over Lys

The enzyme is activated by removal of an N-terminal prepropeptide.

References

External links 
 

EC 3.4.21